The 2022 Islington London Borough Council election took place on 5 May 2022. All 51 members of Islington London Borough Council were be elected. The elections took place alongside local elections in the other London boroughs and elections to local authorities across the United Kingdom.

In the previous election in 2018, the Labour Party maintained its control of the council, winning 47 out of the 48 seats with the Green Party providing the only opposition councillor, Caroline Russell. The 2022 election took place under new election boundaries, with an increase in the number of councillors to 51.

Background

History 

The thirty-two London boroughs were established in 1965 by the London Government Act 1963. They are the principal authorities in Greater London and have responsibilities including education, housing, planning, highways, social services, libraries, recreation, waste, environmental health and revenue collection. Some of the powers are shared with the Greater London Authority, which also manages passenger transport, police and fire.

Since its formation, Islington has been under Labour control, Conservative control, Liberal Democrat control, Social Democratic Party control and no overall control. Labour most recently gained control of the council in the 2010 election, winning 35 seats to the Liberal Democrats' 13 seats. The Liberal Democrats lost all their remaining seats in the 2014 election, with Labour winning 47 and the Green Party's Caroline Russell winning a single seat in Highbury East. In the most recent election in 2018, Labour held their 47 seats with 60.6% of the vote across the borough while Russell held her seat for the Green Party, with the Greens winning 16.4% of the vote across the borough. The Liberal Democrats won 12.3% of the vote and the Conservatives won 9.7% of the vote, but neither won any seats.

Council term 

A Labour councillor for St George's ward, Kat Fletcher, resigned in November 2019. A by-election to replace her was held on 12 December 2019, coinciding with the 2019 general election. The Labour candidate Gulcin Ozdemir, who worked as a social housing advocate, successfully defended the seat, with the Green Party candidate coming in second place.

Gary Poole, a Labour councillor, left his party to sit as an independent in July 2019 citing antisemitism, saying he hoped to rejoin in the future. In October 2020, the Labour councillor Rakhia Ismail left her party, saying she had faced racism in the party. She joined the Conservative Party in November 2020. A Labour councillor for Hollway ward, Paul Smith, resigned in January 2021.

A Labour councillor for Bunhill, Claudia Webbe, was elected as MP for Leicester East in the 2019 general election. She resigned as a councillor in March 2021 as a by-election to replace her was not possible until May 2021 due to the COVID-19 pandemic. In March 2021, three Labour councillors announced their resignations: Andy Hull of Highbury West ward because his family were moving to Morocco; Joe Calouri of Mildmay ward because of work and family commitments; and Vivien Cutler of St Peter's ward. By-elections for all five seats were held on 6 May 2021 alongside the 2021 London mayoral election and London Assembly election. Some of the elections were contested by independent candidates opposed to low traffic neighbourhoods. Labour held all five seats: Valerie Bossman-Quarshie won Bunhill, Bashir Ibrahim won Highbury West, Jason Jackson won Holloway, Angelo Weekes won Mildmay and Toby North won St Peter's. The Green Party came second in three wards and the Conservatives and Liberal Democrats came second in one ward each.

Richard Watts stood down as council leader and leader of the Labour group in 2021, and Kaya Comer-Schwartz was chosen unopposed to take over. Comer-Schwartz had served as deputy leader of the council since 2020 and had previously worked for a mental health charity.

As with most London boroughs, Islington will be electing its councillors under new boundaries decided by the Local Government Boundary Commission for England, which it produced after a period of consulation. The number of councillors will rise to 51, an increase from the previous 48, across seventeen three-councillor wards.

Campaign 
In March 2022, groups of residents supportive and opposed to Low Traffic Neighbourhood schemes protested Islington Town Hall ahead of a debate triggered by an anti-low traffic neighbourhood petition. One attendee, the driving instructor David Corringall, cited the schemes as the reason he was standing as a Conservative candidate.

Electoral process 
Islington, like other London borough councils, elects all of its councillors at once every four years. The previous election took place in 2018. The election will take place by multi-member first-past-the-post voting, with each ward being represented by three councillors. Electors will have as many votes as there are councillors to be elected in their ward, with the top two or three being elected.

All registered electors (British, Irish, Commonwealth and European Union citizens) living in London aged 18 or over were entitled to vote in the election. People who lived at two addresses in different councils, such as university students with different term-time and holiday addresses, were entitled to be registered for and vote in elections in both local authorities. Voting in-person at polling stations took place from 7:00 to 22:00 on election day, and voters were able to apply for postal votes or proxy votes in advance of the election.

Previous council composition

Results summary

Ward results

Arsenal

Barnsbury

Bunhill

Caledonian

Canonbury

Clerkenwell

Finsbury Park

Highbury

Hillrise

Holloway

Junction

Laycock

Mildmay

St Mary's & St James'

St Peter's & Canalside

Tollington

Tufnell Park

References 

Council elections in the London Borough of Islington
Islington